Hernando de Lobo Castrillo, O. Carm. (1590 – October 17, 1651) was a Roman Catholic prelate who served as the Bishop of Puerto Rico (1649–1651).

Biography
Hernando de Lobo Castrillo was born in Navarrete, Spain and ordained a priest in the Order of Carmelites. On December 9, 1649, he was appointed by the King of Spain and confirmed by Pope Innocent X as Bishop of Puerto Rico. On July 26, 1650, he was consecrated bishop by Mauro Diego de Tovar y Valle Maldonado, Bishop of Caracas. He served as Bishop of Puerto Rico until his death on October 17, 1651.

References

External links and additional sources
 (for Chronology of Bishops) 
 (for Chronology of Bishops) 

1590 births
1651 deaths
Bishops appointed by Pope Innocent X
Carmelite bishops
17th-century Roman Catholic bishops in Puerto Rico
Roman Catholic bishops of Puerto Rico